Many email clients now offer some support for Unicode. Some clients will automatically choose between a legacy encoding and Unicode depending on the mail's content, either automatically or when the user requests it.

Technical requirements for sending of messages containing non-ASCII characters by email include
 encoding of certain header fields (subject, sender's and recipient's names, sender's organization and reply-to name) and, optionally, body in a content-transfer encoding
 encoding of non-ASCII characters in one of the Unicode transforms
 negotiating the use of UTF-8 encoding in email addresses and reply codes (SMTPUTF8)
 sending the information about the content-transfer encoding and the Unicode transform used so that the message can be correctly displayed by the recipient (see Mojibake).

If the sender's or recipient's email address contains non-ASCII characters, sending of a message requires also encoding of these to a format that can be understood by mail servers.

Unicode support in protocols
  provides a mechanism for allowing non-ASCII email addresses encoded as UTF-8 in an SMTP or LMTP protocol

Unicode support in message header
To use Unicode in certain email header fields, e.g. subject lines, sender and recipient names, the Unicode text has to be encoded using a MIME "Encoded-Word" with a Unicode encoding as the charset. To use Unicode in domain part of email addresses, IDNA encoding must traditionally be used. Alternatively, SMTPUTF8 allows the use of UTF-8 encoding in email addresses (both in a local part and in domain name) as well as in a mail header section. Various standards had been created to retrofit the handling of non-ASCII data to the originally ASCII-only email protocol:
  provides support for encoding non-ASCII values such as real names and subject lines in email headers
  provides support for encoding non-ASCII domain names in the Domain Name System
  allows the use of UTF-8 in a mail header section

Unicode support in message bodies
As with all encodings apart from US-ASCII, when using Unicode text in email, MIME must be used to specify that a Unicode transformation format is being used for the text.

UTF-7, an obsolete encoding, had an advantage over Unicode encodings, on obsolete non-8bit-clean networks, in that it does not require a transfer encoding to fit within the seven-bit limits of legacy Internet mail servers. On the other hand, UTF-16 must be transfer encoded to fit SMTP data format. Although not strictly required, UTF-8 is usually also transfer encoded to avoid problems across seven-bit mail servers. MIME transfer encoding of UTF-8 makes it either unreadable as a plain text (in the case of base64) or, for some languages and types of text, heavily size inefficient (in the case of quoted-printable). 

Some document formats, such as HTML, PostScript and Rich Text Format have their own 7-bit encoding schemes for non-ASCII characters and can thus be sent without using any special email encodings. E.g. HTML email can use HTML entities to use characters from anywhere in Unicode even if the HTML source text for the email is in a legacy encoding (e.g. 7-bit ASCII). For details of this see Unicode and HTML.

See also
Comparison of email clients
International email

References

External links
SIL's freeware fonts, editors and documentation

Email
Email
Email clients